Jonathan Silver (1949–1997) was an entrepreneur from Bradford, Yorkshire,  who was responsible for restoring Salts Mill as a thriving cultural, retail and commercial centre.

Life 
Silver was born in Bradford, Yorkshire, England in 1949, of German Jewish descent. He was a pupil at Bradford Grammar School where he at first did not shine academically but enjoyed working on the school's magazine. His interest in David Hockney's talent as an artist began to blossom and, after they met at Silver's father's burger bar, Hockney agreed to design a cover for the school magazine. Silver then went on to study Art History and Textiles at Leeds University.

As a young man Silver exhibited entrepreneurial skills and spent his school lunch breaks at the local auction rooms buying and selling furniture. By 1979 he had 13 menswear shops across the country as well as a clothing factory, Noble Crest, and a shop called Art and Furniture in Manchester. In 1979 he sold his Jonathan Silver chain to the John Michael Group, and sold or closed most of his other businesses, and went into partnership with his friend and supplier Sir Ernest Hall.

Dean Clough

In 1983 Hall and Silver bought Dean Clough, a huge former carpet factory in Halifax, West Yorkshire, and began to regenerate it. They contributed equal shares; but the two men had very different business styles, and Hall bought Silver out the next year. According to Hall, Silver's main contribution at Dean Clough was opening and running a very successful bar called Crossley's, but Silver felt that he had contributed very much more than this. Although they did not continue to work together, Hall and Silver remained close friends.

Prior to buying Dean Clough, Hall and Silver bought C&J Hursts in Huddersfield.

Salt's Mill
Having left Dean Clough, and with the proceeds in his pocket, Silver travelled the world with his wife, Maggie, and two young daughters. Once they returned to England, Silver, looking for a new challenge, bought Salts Mill in 1987. The mill was in a dilapidated state but Silver could see the building's potential, and transformed it into retail and commercial units and an art gallery.

One of the first events that took place in Salt's Mill after Silver bought it was some performances by IOU Theatre during the first Bradford Festival. Silver was running the bar during this event, and had the idea then of creating a gallery devoted to David Hockney. He went on to create the 1853 gallery, participating himself in the building work. There have been many theatrical and musical performances since, in various parts of the mill, with Northern Broadsides in particular making Salt's Mill one of their touring venues. The mill has also housed a number of shops, run by Salt's and by independent operators; and several businesses, most notably Pace plc.

The work done by Jonathan Silver in bringing Salts Mill back to life must have played a large part in Saltaire village becoming a UNESCO World Heritage Site in December 2001.

Personal life
With his wife, Maggie, whom he married in 1972,  he had two daughters, Zoë and Davina.

Death

Jonathan Silver died of cancer in 1997.

References

Sources

1949 births
1997 deaths
Alumni of the University of Leeds
Businesspeople from Bradford
Deaths from cancer in England
English people of German-Jewish descent
People educated at Bradford Grammar School
20th-century English businesspeople